Eschnerberg, also Eschner Berg, Schellenberg, (especially used in the Austrian village of Feldkirch) is 698 m high (Klocker close to Hinterschellenberg) mountain of seven peaks in the Rhine Valley, on the borderline of Liechtenstein and the Austrian State Voralberg, close to Feldkirch.

Geography 
The more extense southern part of the mountain is located in the Liechtensteiner Unterland, while the less extense northern part is in the district of Feldkirch, within a region called Voralberger Oberland. The whole mountain itself is about 7 km long and 2 km broad. It goes along the River Rhine.

Settlements on the mountain include Eschen, Mauren, Gamprin, Ruggell and Schellenberg on the Liechtenstein side and the minor districts of Feldkirch Tosters and Fresch (Nofels) on the Austrian side. The highest peak is located on the Liechtenstein side.

Geology 
Eschnerberg is an inselberg, formed by the former Rhine Glacier, being an extension of the Walserkamm. It is part of the a part of the Rhenodanubic Flyschzone, called Voralberger Flysch, of which the neighboring Bregenz Forest Mountains consist, too. For though this classification is orographically and geographically correct, it is classified as part of the Rätikon by the AVE (1984), due to its location south to the River Ill.

History 
This mountain was one of the earliest settled places in Rhine valley (Rössen culture, since 4400 ACN [Neolitics]), artefacts were found in the archeological site of Borscht, close to Schellenberg.

The name Schellenberg is due to the reign of the Schellenberger (see also: Lordship of Schellenberg), nonetheless most Liechtensteiner use the historical term Eschnerberg. The family of Schellenberg named the village of Schellenberg and erected two castles on the mountain Neu-Schellenberg [Obere Burg] (1200) and Alt-Schellenberg [Untere Burg] (1250). The names are given during the excavation in the 1960s, when the archeologes were convinced that the upper site would be the younger one, thus naming it Neu Schellenberg. The equivocation was discovered by the archeologe Jakob Bill in 1980, who additionally found out that they were named the other way round on historical maps and chronicles, also stating that both castles were ruins. They were used as quarrels during the 19th century. Nowadays they belong to the historical society.

Hiking 
There is a hiking path over the Eschnerberg, along which information templates are placed informing about the castles and the history of the region.

References

Geography of Liechtenstein